The European route E5 in France is a series of roads, part of the International E-road network, running from the portal city of Le Havre in northwestern France towards the border with Spain in Hendaye. The E5 originates in Scotland and crosses the English Channel near Southampton. It continues to southern Spain.

Route 
The E5 in France starts in the major port city of Le Havre, Normandy arriving on a non-existing ferry from Southampton, United Kingdom. It follows the N282 until the outskirts of the city, where the A131 starts until it joins the A13 motorway. It passes the capital of Normandy Rouen before arriving in the western suburbs of the French capital of Paris. Paris is passed using the Boulevard Périphérique (ring road) from the Porte d'Auteuil to the Porte d'Orléans. There the E5 shortly follows the A6 through the southern neighbourhoods of Paris, before entering the A10 motorway due south. The A10 continues southwest to the major city of Bordeaux, passing several large cities like Orléans, Blois, Tours, Châtellerault, Poitiers, Niort and Saintes, to end at the Bordeaux ring road. The E5 bypasses the city on the east side, before continuing further south using the A63 motorway. This motorway traverses the sparsely populated Landes de Gascogne Regional Natural Park, to reach the coastal cities of Bayonne and Biarritz and finally end at the Spanish border near Hendaye. It continues south towards San Sebastián, Madrid to end at Algeciras. The E5 passes through four regions (Normandy, Île-de-France, Centre-Val de Loire and Nouvelle-Aquitaine) as well as 15 departments and the city of Paris. The E5 is a toll road at the Tancarville Bridge, between Bourneville-Sainte-Croix and Buchelay on the A13 as an open toll system, from Saint-Arnoult-en-Yvelines to Monnaie and from Sorigny to Virsac on the A10 as a closed system, and from Saugnacq-et-Muret to Biriatou on the A63 as an open system. The road covers a total distance of 985 km (612 mi) in France.

Detailed route

References

France
Road transport in France
E05